Cédric Uras (born 29 November 1977) is a French former footballer who played as a defender.

Honours
 UEFA Intertoto Cup: 1997

References

External links

1977 births
Living people
Footballers from Lyon
French footballers
Association football defenders
Olympique Lyonnais players
Toulouse FC players
SC Bastia players
Falkirk F.C. players
PFC Litex Lovech players
AC Ajaccio players
Ligue 1 players
Scottish Premier League players
First Professional Football League (Bulgaria) players
French expatriate footballers
Expatriate footballers in Bulgaria
Expatriate footballers in Scotland
French expatriate sportspeople in Bulgaria
French expatriate sportspeople in Scotland